The leafscale gulper shark (Centrophorus squamosus) is a dogfish of the family Centrophoridae. C. squamosus is reported to have a lifespan of approximately 70 years, based on otolith ring counts. It was the first described species in the genus Centrophorus, which now contains 13 species.

Physical characteristics

The leafscale gulper shark has no anal fin, two dorsal fins with spines, the first dorsal being relatively low and long, large eyes, and rough leaf-like denticles.

Distribution
Eastern Atlantic around continental slopes from Iceland south to the Cape of Good Hope, western Indian Ocean around Aldabra Islands, and western Pacific around Honshu, Japan, the Philippines, south-east Australia, and New Zealand.

Habits and habitat
Also occurs pelagically in much deeper water. It probably feeds on fish and cephalopods.

It is ovoviviparous with a maximum of five young per litter.

Its meat is utilized dried and salted for human consumption and as fishmeal.

Conservation status 
The New Zealand Department of Conservation has classified the leafscale gulper shark as "Not Threatened" with the qualifier "Secure Overseas" under the New Zealand Threat Classification System.

References

  
 FAO Species Catalogue Volume 4 Parts 1 and 2 Sharks of the World
 

leafscale gulper shark
Fauna of the Southeastern United States
Fish of the East Atlantic
Fish of Japan
Marine fauna of Central Africa
Marine fish of Eastern Australia
Marine fish of New Zealand
Fish of the Philippines
Marine fish of South Africa
Fish of Venezuela
Fauna of New South Wales
Fauna of Seychelles
Irish Sea
leafscale gulper shark